The National Academy for Social Prescribing is a UK government-funded body promoting health and wellbeing. It was launched by the Secretary of State for Health and Social Care, Matt Hancock, on 23 October 2019.

The Academy was tasked with establishing partnerships to promote health and wellbeing at a national and local level.

NHS England provided around £650,000 for the initial set-up costs and the Department of Health and Social Care provided a £5m grant to the academy in 2020/21.

Activities 
In November 2020, the Academy, in collaboration with Sport England, ukactive and NHS England, announced that 500,000 hours of activity would be made available at no cost as part of social prescribing services.

In November 2020, the Academy, in collaboration with Arts Council England, announced the launch of a new £1.4 million Thriving Communities Fund, designed to develop local social prescribing activities across the country. The Academy contributed £1.15 million to the fund, with £250,000 provided by the Arts Council, which administered the fund.

Governance 
As of April 2021, the Academy was overseen by a Board with four members.

 Prof Helen Stokes-Lampard (chair)
 Baroness Tanni Grey-Thompson, director
 Phoebe Vela-Hitchcox, director
 Jonathan Badyal, director

References

External links
 

2019 establishments in the United Kingdom
Public health in the United Kingdom